Richard Rood may refer to:

Richard Rood (wrestler)
Richard Rood (violinist) (born 1955), American violinist
Richard B. Rood, atmospheric scientist
Dick Rude (born 1964), actor and director